Between July 1956 to around November 1961, the National Telefilm Associates (NTA) operated the NTA Film Network, an early television network and syndication service that operated in the United States and Canada. The organization had syndicated television programs to individual stations since the early 1950s. The film network effort was an attempt to launch a viable "fourth television network" that would compete directly with CBS, NBC, and ABC, the three largest television networks in the United States. Although the program service was intended to attract independent television stations, many CBS, NBC, and ABC affiliates also aired NTA programs.

Between 1956 and 1961, NTA offered dozens of programs to affiliated stations. Some popular television series, such as How to Marry a Millionaire, Premiere Performance, Sheriff of Cochise, and The Third Man, each aired on over 100 local television stations. Other NTA programs were never widely seen; for example, after its first few months on the air, Alex in Wonderland aired on just one TV station. Station managers were free to choose which programs they would air, and no television station aired NTA's complete program line-up. Even NTA's three owned-and-operated stations (O&Os), WNTA-TV in New York, KMSP-TV in Minneapolis, and WDAF-TV in Kansas City, "cherry-picked" programs.

As a way of assuring widespread viewership of its programs, NTA sold series to any television station that would air them. This angered station managers who had already signed affiliation agreements with the NTA Film Network, and led to NTA programs being aired on several television stations in the same city. NTA also purposely double-booked or triple-booked some programs to guarantee higher ratings. For example, in New York City, How to Marry a Millionaire aired on three different area stations at the same time. This distribution method led to large numbers of stations airing some NTA offerings — by one estimate 370 stations in 1957.

Many NTA Film Network series were filmed in Hollywood or England; some later NTA programs were videotaped in New York. The film or tape medium of the recordings allowed local station owners to fill in empty spots in their schedules using NTA programs, and allowed the company to re-run its programs years after program production had ceased. NTA attempted to establish a standardized network schedule in 1958, but only 17 local stations agreed to air NTA programs in pattern (during the set time). Although NTA announced provisional plans to telecast sporting and special events over a live network, the network remained distributed almost entirely on film. One notable exception, the public affairs program Open End, was broadcast live from New York City to a network of 10 stations; the rest of the affiliates received the program on videotape.

Although NTA's program service was fairly popular, occasionally attracting up to 22 percent of the viewing audience, the NTA Film Network was never a serious competitor to the "Big Three" television networks. The company had only three O&Os, while the larger networks had five apiece. Executives considered purchasing KTVR in Denver and WITI in Milwaukee, but those stations were never acquired. NTA and its parent company sold the Minneapolis station in November 1959, the Kansas City station in August 1960, and its flagship New York City station in November 1961. NTA continued syndication services even after its flagship station was sold, however, and a few new television series debuted between 1961 and 1965. NTA also re-ran its older filmed programs during this era.

All affiliate television stations are listed below, whether they carried many NTA programs or only a single series. Television stations listed here aired NTA programs between the launch of the network in 1956 and the end of the 1961–1962 television season.

Stations

An asterisk (*) denotes stations that affiliated at the launch of the network.
A dagger (†) indicates stations that aired NTA's few live broadcasts.
A diesis (‡) indicates stations that identified as NTA affiliates in the 1957–1958 Broadcasting/Telecasting Yearbook.

Owned and operated stations of other networks
A number of CBS, ABC, and NBC owned-and-operated stations (O&Os) also aired NTA programs. Among these were:

Radio simulcast
One of the more unusual broadcast agreements during the 1950s was a deal with radio station KSBK (later JORO, now Defunct) in Naha, Okinawa, during the era when Okinawa was a U.S.-administered territory (1952 to 1972). KSBK simulcast the audio portion of the program for U.S. servicemen and their families. A video feed came from mainland Japan. Among the NTA programs broadcast in this way were Divorce Court, George Jessel, and Sheriff of Cochise.

See also
 List of former NTA Film Network affiliates in Canada

Notes

References

Sources
 
 

NTA Film Network affiliates
NTA Film Network